Aaron Leibowitz is an American-born Israeli rabbi.

Rabbinic and political career
Aaron Leibowitz is a noted educator, and started Hashgacha Pratit, a kosher certification independent of the Israeli Chief Rabbinate.

He is also a councilor for the Jerusalem municipality for the Yerushalmim party.

In 2018 Leibowitz handed over the kosher certification to the larger organization, Tzohar, however Leibowitz remained CEO of Hashgacha Pratit. The organization began officiating weddings outside of the Chief Rabbinate, despite this being illegal in Israel. He called the Chief Rabbinate "racist" because of their views on who is a Jew, and their use of DNA testing to determine Jewish status.

References

Living people
Year of birth missing (living people)
American rabbis
Israeli rabbis
Israeli educators
American emigrants to Israel
21st-century American Jews